The 2025 FISU Winter World University Games, known also as the XXXII Winter Universiade and commonly known as Turin 2025 or Torino 2025, is a multi-sport event scheduled from 15 to 26 January 2025 in Turin, Italy. The Piedmontese capital was confirmed as the host city for the games on 15 May 2021. This will be the 12th time in the history that the event will be held in Italy after being held for the seventh time after the most recent 2019 Summer Universiade held in Naples.

Bidding process
On July 6, 2020, representatives from the Metropolitan City of Turin, Piedmont Region, University of Turin, Polytechnic of Turin, CUSI Turin, EDISU and University of Eastern Piedmont formally announced their candidature to host the 2025 games. The bid, known as "Torino 2025" included intentions to host para-sports events, in tandem with the 2025 Winter Special Olympics. The Italian government's Minister of Sport, Vincenzo Spadafora, confirmed his strong support for the candidature on July 7, 2020. The city has hosted the 1959 and 1970 Summer Universiades, the 2007 Winter Universiade, the 2006 Winter Olympics and Paralympics and has a tradition of hosting international sporting events. The capital Rome hosted the Games in 1975, the Sicily hosted it in 1997 replacing Milan and Naples in 2019. The neighboring Sestriere hosted the 1966 and acted as sub-site in 2007, Livigno in Sondrio Province, the 1975 Winter Games. In 1985 it was the turn of the resort of Belluno at Veneto.Another resort Tarvisio at the most northeastern part of the country with neighboring cities Austria and Slovenia co-hosted the 2003 winter event. In 2007, it was the city's first turn to host the Winter Games.And in 2013, the province of Trentino hosted the event.

The other three countries that announced their intentions to host the event are Lucerne in Switzerland after the 2021 Winter Universiade was cancelled and a joint bid from Finland and Sweden,lead by Stockholm as main host.

References

External links
Official website

 
Winter World University Games
2025 in multi-sport events
Winter University Games
Multi-sport events in Italy
International sports competitions hosted by Italy
Sports competitions in Turin
2025 in Italian sport
2020s in Turin
January 2025 sports events